Longview is a neighborhood of Louisville, Kentucky located along Longview and Box Hill Lanes off River Road, and is near Route 60.

References

Neighborhoods in Louisville, Kentucky